Dilophospora is a genus of fungi belonging to the order Dothideomycetes, in the family Sporocadaceae.

The species of this genus are found in Europe, Japan, northern America and Australia.

Species:
Dilophospora alopecuri 
Dilophospora stiparum 

Former species;
 D. albida  = Ciliospora albida, Sebacinaceae
 D. caricum  = Neottiospora caricum, Ascomycota
 D. chilensis  = Plectronidiopsis chilensis, Ascomycota
 D. geranii  = Neottiospora geranii, Ascomycota
 D. graminis  = Dilophospora alopecuri, Dothideomycetes
 D. graminis  = Lidophia graminis, Dothideomycetes
 D. graminis f. holci  = Dilophospora alopecuri, Dothideomycetes
 D. holci  = Dilophospora alopecuri, Dothideomycetes

References

Sordariomycetes
Taxa named by John Baptiste Henri Joseph Desmazières